The women's shot put event  at the 1979 European Athletics Indoor Championships was held on 25 February in Vienna.

There were only three athletes contesting the title which raised suspicions that this may be due to the new, more advanced drug tests that were announced before the competition. Third place finisher, Judy Oakes of Great Britain, reportedly did not show up to receive her bronze medal as she deemed herself unworthy having won it in such circumstances.

Results

References

Shot put at the European Athletics Indoor Championships
Shot
Euro